Subak Kharam Express is a daily express train service between Lahore and Rawalpindi in Pakistan. Subak Kharam means stylish runner. It is run by a private company.

The Subak Kharam Express runs between Lahore and Rawalpindi on a regular basis. Subak Kharam is a fashionable runner. It has economy, AC lower, and AC parlour rooms. It travels 290 kilometers from Lahore to Rawalpindi in 4 hours and 35 minutes.

Route
Lahore to Rawalpindi via Wazirabad and Jhelum

Train stops
 Lahore Jn
 Gujranwala
 Wazirabad Jn
 Gujrat
 Lalamusa Jn
 Jhelum
 Chaklala
 Rawalpindi

References 

Named passenger trains of Pakistan
Passenger trains in Pakistan